Mikki Osei Berko (born 1973) is a Ghanaian-born actor. He played Master Richard in the TV series Taxi Driver and Dada Boat in Dada Boat. He has served as the assemblyman for the Ayidiki electoral area for one term, and is also the executive director of Mediagold Productions in Ghana. Mikki Osei Berko worked extensively with Radio Gold, a private radio station based in Accra, which he left in July 2003 to join Happy FM. He later presented with Kessben FM. He is the brain behind Kente Radio, a Pan-African online radio station.

Filmography
As director
Broken Mirror

As actor
Broken Mirror
Okukuseku

References

External links 
 

Ghanaian male television actors
Ghanaian film producers
1973 births
Living people